Gustavo Jiménez (5 April 1886 – 15 March 1933) was a Peruvian colonel who served as Interim President of Peru, officially as the President of the Provisional Government Junta, in 1931.

Jiménez, who was born in Tarma, organised one of several uprisings that led to the fall of the government of Augusto B. Leguía. After the nomination of General Luis Miguel Sánchez Cerro as the new provisional president, Jiménez kept his supporters under arms since he did not agree with the decision. Following the replacement of Sánchez Cerro with Ricardo Leoncio Elías Arias, Jiménez returned to Lima on 5 March 1931. After entering the presidential palace and a negotiation with Elías, Jiménez became the new president, even though David Samanez Ocampo had been expected to take over presidential power that day.

Due to the continuing unrest in the country and strong resistance against Jiménez from the Navy, Jiménez turned power over to David Samanez Ocampo on 11 March. He died in Lima.

References 
 World Statesmen Leaders of Peru
 Council on Hemispheric Affairs website  Peru Elections: The Military Issue

1886 births
1933 deaths
Presidents of Peru
Peruvian Army officers
People from Pasco Region